Real Steel is a 2011 American science fiction sports drama film starring Hugh Jackman and Dakota Goyo and co-produced and directed by Shawn Levy for DreamWorks Pictures. The film is based on the short story "Steel", written by Richard Matheson, which was originally published in the May 1956 edition of The Magazine of Fantasy & Science Fiction, and later adapted into a 1963 Twilight Zone episode. The film features a former boxer (Jackman) whose sport is now played by robots. He must build and train his own robot with his son. Real Steel was in development for several years before production began on June 24, 2010. Filming took place primarily in the U.S. state of Michigan. Animatronic robots were built for the film, and motion capture technology was used to depict the rodeo brawling of computer-generated robots and animatronics, respectively.

Real Steel was released by Touchstone Pictures in Australia on October 6, 2011, and in the United States and Canada on October 7, 2011, grossing nearly $300 million at the box office. It received mixed reviews, with criticism towards the plot but praise for the visual effects, action sequences, and performances of the cast. The film was nominated for Best Visual Effects at the 84th Academy Awards.

Plot

In 2020, human boxers are replaced by robots. Former boxer Charlie Kenton owns the robot Ambush, until it is destroyed in a fight against a bull belonging to promoter and carnival owner, Ricky. Having bet money he didn't have with Ricky that Ambush would win, Charlie absconds before Ricky can collect.

After the fight, Charlie learns that his ex-girlfriend died and he must attend a hearing deciding the future of their son, Max, a robot-boxing fan with nearly no contact with Charlie since his birth. Max's maternal aunt Debra and her wealthy husband Marvin want full custody. Charlie bargains to cede custody of Max for $100,000, half in advance, and Marvin negotiates that Charlie retain custody of Max for three months while Marvin and Debra go on vacation. Settling into a gym owned by Bailey Tallet, the daughter of Charlie's former boxing coach, Charlie uses the half in advance money to acquire the once-famous World Robot Boxing robot Noisy Boy. He and Max take Noisy Boy to Crash Palace, an underworld boxing arena run by his friend Finn, where Noisy Boy is destroyed against another robot boxer, Midas. While scavenging for replacements in a junkyard, Max discovers Atom, an obsolete, dilapidated but mostly intact sparring robot designed to withstand severe damage, with a rare "shadow function" to mirror and memorize handler or opponent movements.

At Max's behest, Charlie pits Atom against another robot Metro and is surprisingly victorious. Max integrates Noisy Boy's voice command hardware with Atom and convinces Charlie to assist in streamlining Atom's movements. This results in a series of victories, culminating in Charlie being offered a World Robot Boxing fight with Atom against national champion robot Twin Cities. The fight starts with Atom on the attack, but Twin Cities easily takes the offensive. Charlie notices a hitch whenever Twin Cities throws a right punch, and he exploits this to win by knockout. Elated by their success, Max challenges undefeated global champion robot Zeus, with the audience squarely on their side. After the fight, Ricky and two henchmen attack Charlie for bailing earlier and rob him and Max of their winnings, prompting a defeated and dejected Charlie to return Max to Debra.

This upsets Max, and when Charlie tries to convince Max that it's better to live without him, Max reveals that all he wanted was for Charlie to fight for him and be there as a father. After Max leaves, Charlie returns to Tallet's Gym and talks with Bailey about the events, where the two kiss, revealing their attraction to each other. Persuaded by Bailey, Charlie reconciles with Max and convinces Debra to allow Max to witness the fight with Zeus that Charlie has arranged.

Later on, when the fight begins, Zeus knocks Atom down with its first punch and dominates the first round, but Atom manages to survive the first round, stunning the audience. Ricky, who bet $100,000 with Finn on Atom losing within the first round, tries to leave but is cornered by Finn and his fight bookmakers. As the fight continues, Atom lands multiple punches and withstands further attacks but makes no definitive progress. Late in the fourth round, Atom's voice-response controls are damaged, forcing Charlie to fight Zeus with Atom's shadow function. In the fifth and final round, Atom wards off Zeus long enough to deplete its power core, at which point Charlie directs Atom to begin its counterattack against a tired and helpless Zeus. With Zeus's programmers unable to compensate, the designer, Tak Mashido, intervenes and controls Zeus manually. Atom gives Zeus a sound beating, who barely avoids losing by knockout. Zeus wins by decision and remains undefeated, but Mashido's group are left humiliated by the near-loss and Zeus being critically damaged. Despite the match result, Atom is triumphantly labeled the "People's Champion" by the cheering crowd as Max and Charlie celebrate.

Cast

Production

Based on Richard Matheson's 1956 short story "Steel", the original screenplay was written by Dan Gilroy and was purchased by DreamWorks for $850,000 in 2003 or 2005 (sources differ). The project was one of 17 that DreamWorks took from Paramount Pictures when they split in 2008. Director Peter Berg expressed interest in the project in mid-2009 but went no further. Levy was attached to the project in September 2009, and Jackman was cast in the starring role in November for a $9 million fee. In the same month, Steven Spielberg and Stacey Snider at DreamWorks greenlit the project. Les Bohem and Jeremy Leven had worked on Gilroy's screenplay, but in 2009 John Gatins was working on a new draft. When Levy joined the project, he worked with Gatins to revise the screenplay, spending a total of six weeks fine-tuning the script. Advertising company FIVE33 did a two-hundred page "bible" about robot boxing. Levy said he was invited by Spielberg and Snider while finishing Date Night, and while the director initially considered Real Steel to have "a crazy premise," he accepted after reading the script and feeling it could be "a really humanistic sports drama."

Levy chose to set the film in state fairs and other "old-fashioned" Americana settings that would exude nostalgia and create a warm tone for the film's father-son story. There was also an attempt for the scenery to blend in new and old technology. Filming began in June 2010, and ended by October 15, 2010. Locations include areas around Detroit, Michigan, and across the state, including at the Renaissance Center, the Cobo Arena, the Detroit Fire Department headquarters, the Russell Industrial Center, the Ingham County Courthouse in Mason, Michigan, the Leslie Michigan Railroad Depot, the former Belle Isle Zoo, and the Highland Park Ford Plant.

Jason Matthews of Legacy Effects, successor to Stan Winston Studios, was hired to turn production designer Tom Meyer's robot designs into practical animatronic props. He said, "We have 26-and-a-half total live-action robots that were made for this film. They all have hydraulic neck controls. Atom has RC [radio-controlled] hands as well." According to Jackman, executive producer Spielberg "actually said to Shawn, 'You should really have real elements where you can.' ... Basically if they're not walking or fighting, that's a real robot." Levy added that Spielberg gave the example of Jurassic Park, where Winston's animatronic dinosaurs "got a better performance from the actors, as they were seeing something real, and gave the visual effects team an idea of what it would look like." As Real Steel was not based on a toy, Meyer said that "there was no guideline" for the robots, and each was designed from scratch, with an attempt to put "different personality and aesthetics," according to Levy. In Atom's case, it tried to have a more humanizing design to be an "everyman" who could attract the audience's sympathy and serve as a proxy to the viewer, with a fencing mask that Meyer explained served to show "his identity was a bit hidden, so you have to work harder to get to see him." Executive producer Robert Zemeckis added that the mask "became a screen so we can project what we want on Atom's face." Damage was added to the robots' decoration to show how they were machines worn out by intense battles.

For scenes when computer-generated robots brawl, "simulcam" motion capture technology, developed for the film Avatar, was used. As Levy described the process, "[Y]ou're not only capturing the fighting of live human fighters, but you're able to take that and see it converted to [CGI] robots on a screen instantaneously. Simulcam puts the robots in the ring in real time, so you are operating your shots to the fight, whereas even three, four years ago, you used to operate to empty frames, just guessing at what stuff was going to look like." Boxing hall-of-famer Sugar Ray Leonard was an adviser for these scenes and gave Jackman boxing lessons so his moves would be more natural.

Release
Real Steel had its world premiere on September 6, 2011, in Paris at the Le Grand Rex. The film had its United States premiere on October 2, 2011, in Los Angeles at the Gibson Amphitheatre. It was commercially released in Australia on October 6, 2011, followed by the United States and Canada on October 7, 2011. Its U.S. release, by Walt Disney Studios Motion Pictures, was originally scheduled for November 18, 2011, but it was moved earlier to avoid competition with the first part of The Twilight Saga: Breaking Dawn. The film was released in 3,440 theaters in the United States and Canada, including 270 IMAX screenings. There were also over 100 IMAX screenings in territories outside the United States and Canada, with 62 screenings on October 7.

Marketing
DreamWorks released the first trailer for Real Steel in December 2010 and it was attached to Tron: Legacy. In May 2011, DreamWorks released a second trailer. While the film features boxing robots, Levy said he wanted to show in the trailer "the father-son drama, the emotion Americana of it". He said, "We are very much the robo-boxing movie, but that's one piece of a broader spectrum." In addition to marketing trailers and posters, DreamWorks enlisted the British advertising company Five33 to build large physical displays representing the film as it had done for Pirates of the Caribbean: On Stranger Tides. The studio also collaborated with Virgin America to name one of their Airbus A320s after the film, and one of the film's robots is pictured on its fuselage. On September 19, Jackman appeared on the weekly sports entertainment program WWE Raw to promote the film. In addition to Jackman making an appearance on the show, WWE named Crystal Method's "Make Some Noise" from the film's soundtrack as the official theme song for their returning PPV, Vengeance.

Jakks Pacific released a toy line with action figures based on Atom, Zeus, Noisy Boy, Midas and Twin Cities. The company has also released a one-on-one, playset fighting game with robots in a ring.
ThreeA released a line of high-end sixth-scale figures, as adapted by Australian artist Ashley Wood, based on Ambush, Atom, Midas, and Noisy Boy.

Video game
Jump Games released a fighting video game based on the film for Android and iOS devices, and Yuke's made a game for the PS3 and Xbox 360. An arcade game was also released by Innovative Concepts in Entertainment (ICE).

Home media
The film was released on DVD, Blu-ray, and both high-definition and standard-definition digital download on January 24, 2012, from Touchstone Home Entertainment. Additional material includes Disney Second Screen; deleted and extended scenes with introductions by director Levy; and a profile of film consultant Sugar Ray Leonard.

Reception

Box office
Real Steel earned $85.5 million in North America, and $213.8 million in other territories, for a worldwide total of $299.3 million. It had a worldwide opening of $49.4 million. In North America, it topped the box office with $8.5 million on its opening day and $27.3 million in total on its opening weekend, claiming the number one spot, ahead of the other new nationwide release (The Ides of March) and all holdovers. It managed first-place debuts in 11 countries including Hugh Jackman's native Australia ($4.2 million).

Critical response
On Rotten Tomatoes, the film has an approval rating of 60% based on reviews from 233 critics, with an average rating of 5.91/10. The website's consensus is, "Silly premise notwithstanding, this is a well-made Hollywood movie: Thrilling and exciting action with just enough characterization." On Metacritic, the film has a weighted average score of 56 out of 100, based on reviews from 34 critics, indicating "mixed or average reviews". Audiences surveyed by CinemaScore during the opening weekend gave the film a grade A, on a scale from A+ to F.

Roger Ebert of the Chicago Sun-Times rated the film 3 stars out of 4, saying, "Real Steel is a real movie. It has characters, it matters who they are, it makes sense of its action, it has a compelling plot. Sometimes you go into a movie with low expectations and are pleasantly surprised." Lisa Schwarzbaum of Entertainment Weekly gave the film an A−, saying director Levy "makes good use of his specialized skill in blending people and computer-made imaginary things into one lively, emotionally satisfying story".

Claudia Puig of USA Today said, "Though the premise of fighting robots does seem a plausible and intriguing extension of the contemporary WWE world, Real Steel is hampered by leaden, clichéd moments in which a stubborn boy teaches his childish father a valuable lesson." James White of the UK magazine Empire gave the film 3 of 5 stars, saying, "Rocky with robots? It's not quite in Balboa's weight class, but Real Steel at least has some heft. There's barely a story beat among the beat-downs that you won't expect, and sometimes the saccharine gets in the way of the spectacle, but on the whole this is enjoyable family entertainment."

Accolades

Music

Soundtrack
Real Steels soundtrack consists of 13 tracks featuring artists including Foo Fighters, Tom Morello, Eminem, Royce da 5'9" (Bad Meets Evil), Yelawolf, 50 Cent, and Limp Bizkit. Levy, a fan of The Crystal Method, invited that duo to contribute to the soundtrack; they recorded two new songs for it after viewing a rough cut of the film.

Score
The score album, "Real Steel: Original Motion Picture Score", consists of 19 tracks composed by Danny Elfman, and was released on November 1, 2011, in the US. Levy considered Elfman one of the few composers who could do a score similar to that of the Rocky franchise, alternating guitar-based ambient music and songs with a full orchestra.

Future

Potential sequel 
On August 8, 2021, Levy said that he wants to reunite Jackman and also Ryan Reynolds for a sequel to Real Steel. According to Levy, a Real Steel sequel is something he has always discussed with Jackman, and that it would be interesting if he could get Reynolds to star in it as well.

Television series 
On January 14, 2022, it was reported that a series is in early development for Disney+.

See also

 "Steel" (The Twilight Zone), a 1963 episode of The Twilight Zone also based on Richard Matheson's short story
 "Raging Bender" from the second season of Futurama also depicts a hidden human controller of a robotic boxer.
 List of sports films – boxing

Notes

References

External links

 
 

2011 films
2011 science fiction action films
2010s sports drama films
21 Laps Entertainment films
American boxing films
American robot films
American science fiction action films
American sports drama films
DreamWorks Pictures films
Films about father–son relationships
Films scored by Danny Elfman
Films based on science fiction short stories
Films based on works by Richard Matheson
Films directed by Shawn Levy
Films set in 2020
Films set in the future
Films set in Detroit
Films set in Georgia (U.S. state)
Films set in New York City
Films set in Texas
Films shot in Detroit
Films shot in Michigan
Films using motion capture
Films with screenplays by John Gatins
ImageMovers films
IMAX films
Reliance Entertainment films
Touchstone Pictures films
Films produced by Don Murphy
2010s English-language films
2010s American films